Ao Gao (born 26 July 1990 in Beijing) is a female Chinese water polo player who was part of the silver medal winning team at the 2007 World Junior Championship. She competed at the 2008 Summer Olympics and the 2012 Summer Olympics. She has also played water polo at Arizona State University.

See also
China at the 2012 Summer Olympics
Water polo at the 2012 Summer Olympics – Women's tournament

References
 profile
 Arizona State Profile.

1990 births
Living people
Chinese female water polo players
Olympic water polo players of China
Sportspeople from Beijing
Water polo players at the 2008 Summer Olympics
Water polo players at the 2012 Summer Olympics
Universiade medalists in water polo
Universiade gold medalists for China
Medalists at the 2009 Summer Universiade
21st-century Chinese women